Jake Wieneke (born September 15, 1994) is a professional gridiron football wide receiver for the Saskatchewan Roughriders of the Canadian Football League (CFL). He played college football at South Dakota State and signed with the Minnesota Vikings as an undrafted free agent in 2018. He was cut by the Vikings prior to the 2018 season, and then signed by the Salt Lake Stallions of the Alliance of American Football (AAF).

Early years
Wieneke attended Maple Grove Senior High School, where he was a three-sport star in football, basketball and track and field. After dealing with injuries for the most part of his junior season, Wieneke established himself as one of the top wide receivers in the state of Minnesota during his senior season. He was a first-team All-State selection and Mr. Football finalist after recording 68 receptions for 1,330 yards and 13 touchdowns. Following his senior campaign, he was invited to play at the Minnesota All-Star Game held in June 2013 and was named the North Offensive MVP after catching two touchdown passes.

College career
After redshirting in 2013, Wieneke was the runner-up for the Jerry Rice Award as the Football Championship Subdivision's top freshman the following year. He garnered second-team Associated Press (AP) All-American status and his first first-team All-Missouri Valley Football Conference (MVFC) nod after catching 73 passes for 1,404 yards and a school-record 16 touchdowns. Wieneke finished his collegiate career as the Missouri Valley Football Conference career leader in receptions with 288, in receiving yards with 5,157 and in receiving touchdowns with 59.

Statistics

Professional career

Minnesota Vikings
As the 2018 NFL Draft was coming to an end, Wieneke was hoping he would not be selected. With five picks to go, he received a call from the Vikings' wide receivers coach Darrell Hazell asking if he wanted to sign as a free agent with Minnesota if not taken. "So for the last five picks of the draft, I was just kind of hoping that I don't get drafted and I get to sign with the Vikings," Wieneke said. When the draft ended, Wieneke agreed to terms with the Minnesota Vikings. Wieneke stated: "It's the best feeling in the world, I get to stay with the team I grew up loving and I get to stay in Minnesota. It can't be anything better than this." He was waived on August 31, 2018.

Salt Lake Stallions
Wieneke signed with the Salt Lake Stallions of the Alliance of American Football, but was released in January 2019.

Montreal Alouettes
On January 4, 2019, Wieneke signed with the Montreal Alouettes. He played in all 18 regular season games in 2019 where he recorded 41 receptions for 569 yards and eight touchdowns. At the end of the year, he was awarded the Frank M. Gibson Trophy as the East Division's Most Outstanding Rookie. He did not play in 2020 due to the cancellation of the 2020 CFL season. He signed a one-year contract extension with the Alouettes on January 19, 2021.

In 2021, Wieneke played in all 14 regular season games where he had 56 catches for 898 yards and a league-leading 11 touchdowns. At the end of the season, he was named a CFL All-Star.

In his third season with the team, Weineke saw a drop in production as he played in 16 regular season games, but had 45 receptions for 589 yards and just two touchdowns. He also didn't record more than 70 receiving yards in a game until the penultimate regular season game where he had five catches for 121 yards and a touchdown. In the playoffs, he had nine catches for 107 yards and one touchdown in two games. He became a free agent upon the expiry of his contract on February 14, 2023.

Saskatchewan Roughriders
On February 14, 2023, it was announced that Weineke had signed with the Saskatchewan Roughriders.

Personal life
Wieneke was born to parents Susan and Eric Wieneke, who attended all 18 Alouettes regular season games and one playoff game in 2019. Wieneke and his wife, Brenda, have one son, Israel, who was born in 2020. Wieneke also has a brother, Clark.

References

External links
 Saskatchewan Roughriders bio
 South Dakota State Jackrabbits football bio

1994 births
Living people
People from Maple Grove, Minnesota
American football wide receivers
Players of American football from Minnesota
South Dakota State Jackrabbits football players
Minnesota Vikings players
Salt Lake Stallions players
Montreal Alouettes players
Canadian Football League Rookie of the Year Award winners
Saskatchewan Roughriders players